Sall is a village and a church parish in the Favrskov municipality in the Danish region of Midtjylland. In former times the village has been known as Sal, Sald (Pontoppidan) and Salle (Trap). The village itself has a population of 226 (1 January 2022) and is situated centrally in Sall Parish.

In the village there is a church belonging to the Church of Denmark, a village hall, and a primary school covering all ten classes with 185 pupils (22 May 2017). There is also a Kindergarten and a car repair shop. A whisky distillery has been planned using locally grown organic barley and fresh ground water.

In the middle of the twentieth century the village had three grocery stores, a butcher, a baker, a post office and several other shops.  They have since closed.  From 1914 to 1956 Sall was a station on the railway line Aarhus-Hammel-Thorsø.

Notable residents
 Jacob Jensen, (Danish Wiki) (1819 in Sall – 1882), a member of parliament and a teacher in Sall from 1847–1882.

References

Towns and settlements in Favrskov Municipality